Mark Louis Dindal (born May 1960) is an American film director, effects animator, screenwriter, character designer, storyboard artist and voice actor, who is famous for having directed three animated films, Cats Don't Dance (1997), The Emperor's New Groove (2000), and Chicken Little (2005). He worked in many Disney projects as an effects animator, and also led the special effects for several films, such as The Little Mermaid (1989) and The Rescuers Down Under (1990).

Early life
Dindal was born in Columbus, Ohio in 1960.

Growing up, Dindal was influenced by Disney films and Warner Bros. Saturday cartoons. One of his earliest influence was Disney's The Sword in the Stone, which he remembers his grandmother taking him to see when he was three years old. It also helped that his dad took art as a hobby and taught Dindal to draw while growing up in Syracuse, New York.

During his teen years, Dindal attended Jamesville-DeWitt High School, where he attended most of the art classes that the school had to offer, along with making comic strips and short films. Dindal learned animation at CalArts. He began working at Disney in 1980.

Career

Effects Animator at Disney (1980-1988)
His early work included The Fox and the Hound (1981), The Black Cauldron (1985), Mickey's Christmas Carol (1983), The Great Mouse Detective (1986), and Oliver & Company (1988), each following a very similar animation style in all the films. This style consisted of similar backgrounds with delicate animation and complex character effects, which was well received.

Leaving and Returning to Disney (1986–1992)
After these projects, Dindal briefly left Disney to work on several projects for varying studios, including BraveStarr and The Brave Little Toaster. He returned to the studio in 1987 and got his first head role as a visual effects supervisor for The Little Mermaid (1989). He later worked as head animator for the film The Rescuers Down Under (1990) and worked as an effects animator on the animated film Aladdin (1992).

Dindal as Director (1991–2000)
Dindal’s first time in the director’s chair was for a short, 1940s style wartime propaganda segment for the 1991 superhero film, The Rocketeer. Working with a crew of 3 other animators, Dindal took inspiration from Disney wartime cartoons like Victory Through Air Power and Frank Capra’s Why We Fight series.

Dindal's feature-length debut was Cats Don't Dance, which was released in 1997, three years before The Emperor's New Groove was released in 2000. In Cats Don't Dance Dindal voiced Max. The film won the Annie Award for Best Animated Film and Dindal was nominated for directing. The Emperor's New Groove was initially expected to be a Disney musical feature called Kingdom of the Sun. However, the idea did not work out, so Dindal, along with Chris Williams and David Reynolds changed the script to a comedy. During the six-year production, he started to work on Cats Don't Dance, a Turner Broadcasting (since merged into Warner Bros.) animated musical production.

Chicken Little (2005)
Dindal worked on Chicken Little (2005), another Disney production, which needed a large animation team. Dindal voiced Morkubine Porcupine and Coach in the film. The film was nominated to several Annies, though Dindal was not nominated as a director. During the film's production, DisneyToon Studios produced Kronk's New Groove as a direct-to-video feature. As Dindal was working on Chicken Little at the time, he did not have a position on the staff. Later, Dindal created the TV series The Emperor's New School (2006–2008).

Post-Disney (2006–present)
In March 2006, a day after the DVD release of Chicken Little, Dindal and producer Randy Fullmer left the company because they were reportedly tired of dealing with then-WDFA head David Stainton. Over the span of three years, Dindal was attached to direct several live-action films, including Sherlock's Secretary and Housebroken, both for Walden Media, and a film adaptation of the children's book Kringle for Paramount Pictures.

In December 2010, Dindal was directing at DreamWorks Animation the animated film  Me and My Shadow, based on his own pitch that would've combined both computer and traditional animation. In January 2012, he was no longer directing the film and was replaced by story artist Alessandro Carloni as director, and the film has been in development limbo since 2013.

In July 2014, he provided illustrations for the documentary film Restrung, centering on colleague Randy Fullmer on his career at Wyn Guitars from 2006. On November 12, 2018, it was announced that Dindal will direct an animated Garfield feature for Alcon Entertainment, with pre-production beginning the following month in Los Angeles. In March 2019, Dindal was involved as a story artist and helped design the characters, Gus and Cooper, for the 2019 Nickelodeon film, Wonder Park. That same year, it was announced that Dindal, along with Pixar veteran Teddy Newton, will develop a film based on the Funko pop figures for Warner Animation Group.

In November 2021, it was announced that Garfield was picked up by Sony Pictures Releasing for a worldwide release (excluding China), and will star Chris Pratt as the titular role. The film will also reunite Dindal with New Groove screenwriter David Reynolds, who's writing the script. In August 2022, the film was scheduled to be released on February 16, 2024.

Unrealized projects
 Original version of Cats Don't Dance - long before Dindal was attached as director, Cats Don't Dance was initially a live-action/CG-animated hybrid film that would have involved Michael Jackson as producer, star, and musical consultant. By 1994, Jackson left the project entirely (for Turner Feature Animation; 1993).
 Kingdom of the Sun - an epic retelling of The Prince and the Pauper in the vein of The Lion King. The story was rewritten in 1998 as a smaller comedy titled The Emperor's New Groove (for Walt Disney Feature Animation; 1994).
 Original version of Chicken Little - the original version of Chicken Little would have followed an overreacting, doom and gloomy female chicken, that went to summer camp to build confidence so she would not overreact, as well as to repair her relationship with her father. At the summer camp, she would uncover a nefarious plot that her camp counselor was planning against her hometown. The plot was completely reworked, when David Stainton became the new head of Walt Disney Feature Animation in 2003 (for Walt Disney Feature Animation; 2001).
 Sherlock's Secretary - a live-action film about a man who resides at the infamous home of Sherlock Holmes, who receives a letter requesting the help of Holmes. The man's life changes when he decides to take on a case himself (for Walden Media; 2006).
 Kringle - a film adaption based the book under the same name that tells the untold story of Santa Claus (for Paramount Pictures; 2007).
 Housebroken - a live-action comedy film about a newly wed's talking pets, who must adjust to living together under one roof. Along with directing, Dindal would also polish the script, originally written by Made of Honor screenwriter Adam Sztykiel. The last update was in 2011 when the film would be rewritten by George Lopez executive producers Paul Kaplan and Mark Torgove (for Walden Media and 20th Century Fox; 2009).
 Me and My Shadow - (for DreamWorks Animation; 2010)

Personal life
Dindal is the father of two daughters, who were the inspiration for his original Chicken Little pitch.

Filmography

Internet

Awards and nominations

Nominations
 Best Individual Achievement: Directing in a Feature Production for Cats Don't Dance (Annie) (1997)
 Outstanding Individual Achievement for Writing in an Animated Feature Production for The Emperor's New Groove (Annie) (2001)
 Outstanding Individual Achievement for Directing in an Animated Feature Production for The Emperor's New Groove (Annie) (2001)
 Best Animated Feature for The Emperor's New Groove & Chicken Little (Annie) (2001; 2006)
 Best Animated or Mixed Media Feature for The Emperor's New Groove & Chicken Little (Satellite Award) (2000; 2005)
 Best Animated Feature for Chicken Little (Critics' Choice Movie Awards) (2005)

Won
 Best Animated Feature for Cats Don't Dance (Annie) (1997)

Collaborators

References

External links

 
 Mark Dindal's Place in the Sun by Joe Strike at Animation World Network.
 Mark Dindal on Tumblr

1960 births
Living people
Animators from Ohio
American male screenwriters
American animated film directors
California Institute of the Arts alumni
Artists from Columbus, Ohio
Film directors from Ohio
Screenwriters from Ohio
Walt Disney Animation Studios people
Annie Award winners